Daniel Delgadillo may refer to:
 Daniel Delgadillo (swimmer), (born 1989), Mexican marathon swimmer
 Daniel Delgadillo (footballer) (born 1994), Mexican professional association football player